Omega Ouzeri is a Greek restaurant and bar on Seattle's Capitol Hill, in the U.S. state of Washington.

Description 
The Greek restaurant Omega Ouzeri is located on Capitol Hill. The interior has a white and blue color scheme and the flag of Greece has been displayed on the exterior. The restaurant has served grilled octopus, sea bass, lamb shoulder stifado with Sifnian chickpeas, and oysters in rosé vinegar and shallot mignonette. The brunch menu has included bougatsa, meze, gyros, and a pork belly benedict with harissa hollandaise sauce.

For New Year's Eve in 2019, the restaurant offered a four-course meal with meze platters as well as feta fondu, octopus, poached grouper, pan-seared duck breast, and vegetarian moussaka as options. For Easter in 2021, during the COVID-19 pandemic, the restaurant offered take-out meals with pita and dips, lamb shoulder with lemon roasted potatoes, spanakopita, beet salad, and rice pudding or baklava.

Lonely Planet says, "In an unassuming, square brick building, Omega Ouzeri's doors open to a bright, airy restaurant, pristine in white and baby blue, with metallic and marble accents throughout. Omega celebrates ouzo (a traditional anise-flavored aperitif), and its dishes range from gigantes (braised butter beans) to octapodi (grilled octopus) and are prepared thoughtfully and beautifully." According to KING-TV's Ellen Meny, the restaurant has "one of the largest Greek wine lists on the West Coast, as well as a wide variety of ouzo".

History 
Thomas Soukakos opened the restaurant in January 2015. Zoi Antonitsas became chef later in the year.

Reception 
Thrillist says, "This Capitol Hill Greek spot does a fairly good impression of Greek island life, serving up small plates to the tune of fried greek potatoes and roasted cauliflower with taramosalata. Casual and filled with conversation background noise, the brightly lit space is ideal for date night -- with a significant other, or your appetite." Omega topped The National Herald's 2022 list of the top ten Greek restaurants in the United States. Gabe Guarente, Mark Van Streefkerk, and Jade Yamazaki Stewart included Omega in Eater Seattle's 2022 overview of 25 "essential" Capitol Hill restaurants.

See also 

 List of Greek restaurants

References

External links 

 
 Omega Ouzeri at Zomato

2015 establishments in Washington (state)
Capitol Hill, Seattle
Greek restaurants in Washington (state)